"Last Hurrah" is a song by American singer Bebe Rexha. It was released as a single on February 15, 2019.

Promotion
Rexha revealed the cover art and release date on social media on February 7, 2019, after teasing the title and its initials "LH" for a period of time. The cover art depicts Rexha, in close-up and in a red light, wearing a crown of thorns. She performed the song on Live with Kelly and Ryan on February 25 at the Dolby Theatre after the 91st Academy Awards ceremony. She performed the song again on The Late Show with Stephen Colbert on March 4.

Critical reception
Mike Wass of Idolator called the track "an instantly catchy banger about making better choices" with a "defiant" chorus, saying that "Anyone with a self-destructive streak or knack for making bad decisions will feel every word."

Track listing
Digital download
"Last Hurrah" – 2:30
Digital download
"Last Hurrah" (Acoustic) – 2:36
Digital download
"Last Hurrah" (David Guetta Remix) – 3:11

Charts

Certifications

Release history

References

2019 singles
2019 songs
Bebe Rexha songs
Songs written by Lauren Christy
Songs written by Bebe Rexha
Music videos directed by Joseph Kahn
Songs written by Andrew Wells (record producer)